Sarah Aldrich (born February 10, 1970) is an American actress.

Biography
Aldrich was born in Los Angeles, Sarah spent her childhood in Northern California. She first discovered her love for the theater in college, prompting her to attend the American Conservatory Theater training program and ultimately to earn a degree in theater at UCLA.

Career
Aldrich got her start in television on guest role on Silk Stalkings in 1996. She is also familiar to daytime audiences for her roles as Jill Stevens on Days of Our Lives from 1996 to 1997 and as Victoria Newman, replacing Heather Tom, on The Young and the Restless in 1997 before Tom's return.

In June 1998, Aldrich joined the cast of General Hospital's spinoff Port Charles as Courtney Kanelos, the ex-girlfriend of Joe Scanlon.

She has also had guest-starring roles on Beverly Hills, 90210, Criminal Minds, Without a Trace, Total Security, and The Jenny McCarthy Show. She also appeared in an episode of the Fox original series Bones, as well as an episode of the TV series Charmed.

References

External links

1970 births
Living people
American soap opera actresses
People from Mission Viejo, California
Actresses from California
American Conservatory Theater alumni
UCLA Film School alumni
21st-century American women